The Oklahoma Army National Guard is the Army National Guard component of the Oklahoma National Guard. The Commander in Chief of the Oklahoma National Guard is the Governor of Oklahoma, who appoints the State Adjutant General (TAG), a Major General from either Army or Air. Currently, the TAG is Brig. Gen. Thomas H. Mancino. The previous TAG was Maj. Gen. Michael Thompson.

The history of the OK ARNG SOF aviation "Lords of Darkness" is complicated. Early aviation units in the OK ARNG appears to have included the 245th Medical Company (Air Ambulance) and the 145th Aviation Company (1968), seemingly amalgamated into the 445th Aviation Company (1971); the 445th Aviation Company was reorganized as Company B, 149th Aviation Battalion (September 1978); and in May 1982, the 45th Aviation Battalion (Light Combat Helicopter) was organised as a Special Operations Forces unit. Organizational Authority #168-87 (5 August 1987) reorganized the 45th Aviation Battalion as the 1st Battalion, 245th Aviation, as of 1 October 1987. On 5 August 1987 the 245th Aviation was constituted in the Oklahoma Army National Guard, a parent regiment under the United States Army Regimental System. It was organized 1 October 1987 to consist of the 1st Battalion (Special Operations) (Airborne) at Sperry. The 1st Battalion relocated to Tulsa on 1 July 1989. In 1986-87 there was a struggle by the OK ARNG to be accepted as a Special Operations Aviation team member by Army Special Operations Command at Fort Bragg and the active Army's 160th Special Operations Aviation Regiment. But it appears that this process was generally successful. The unit flew 6,298 flying hours in 1992. The unit may have been deactivated in 1994.

At some point 1st Battalion, 245th Aviation (Special Operations) was reorganized into 1st Battalion (Airfield Operations), 245th Aviation. In January 2016 the unit was preparing for deployment to the Middle East; at that time, pre-deployment training was scheduled for May-June 2016 at the state training site, Camp Gruber.

Units
The Oklahoma Army National Guard consists of the following elements: 
Joint Forces Command--Ground Component
90th Troop Command
Headquarters, 90th Troop Command at Oklahoma City, Oklahoma
120th Engineer Battalion at Broken Arrow, Oklahoma
 Headquarters and Headquarters Company
 Company A (Forward Support Company)
 3120th Engineer Company 
 2120th Engineer Company 
 1120th Engineer Detachment
 120th Medical Company (Area Support) 
345th Combat Sustainment Support Battalion
 Headquarters and Headquarters Company
 1245th Transportation Company
 745th Military Police Company
 Company A, 777th Aviation Support Battalion (Distribution), Okmulgee, Oklahoma
63d Civil Support Team (WMD)
145th Army Band
145th Mobile Public Affairs Detachment
 2d Battalion, 245th Aviation Regiment
 Headquarters and Headquarters Company
 Company C
 3rd Battalion (Security & Support), 140th Aviation Regiment
Company C
Detachment 1
 2d Battalion (General Support), 149th Aviation Regiment
Company B (CH-47)
Detachment 1
 1st Battalion (General Support), 169th Aviation Regiment
Company C
Detachment 1
 2d Battalion, 238th Aviation Regiment
 Company F
 834th Aviation Support Battalion
 Company B
Medical Detachment
45th Infantry Brigade Combat Team
1st Squadron (RSTA), 180th Cavalry Regiment
 2d Battalion, 134th Infantry Regiment (Airborne) (Nebraska Army National Guard) 
1st Battalion, 179th Infantry Regiment
1st Battalion, 279th Infantry Regiment
1st Battalion, 160th Field Artillery Regiment (105mm Towed)
700th Brigade Support Battalion
545th Brigade Engineer Battalion
45th Field Artillery Brigade
Headquarters and Headquarters Battery
1st Battalion, 158th Field Artillery Regiment (HIMARS)
271st Brigade Support Battalion
205th Signal Company (Network)
Oklahoma Regional Training Institute
1st Battalion, 189th Field Artillery Regiment
2d Battalion (General Support), 189th Field Artillery Regiment

The OKARNG controls the Camp Gruber Maneuver Training Center located near Braggs, Oklahoma.

History
In 2021, the Oklahoma National Guard soldiers and Airmen helped to distribute food and water to citizens affected by Hurricane Ida.

Historic units
  158th Field Artillery Regiment
  160th Field Artillery Regiment
  171st Field Artillery Regiment
  189th Field Artillery Regiment
  179th Infantry Regiment
  180th Infantry Regiment

References

External links
Bibliography of Oklahoma Army National Guard History compiled by the United States Army Center of Military History

United States Army National Guard by state
Military in Oklahoma